This list is of topics related to Prem Rawat (Maharaji).

Organizations 

 Elan Vital
 Divine Light Mission
 Divine United Organization/Raj Vidya Kender
 HDSK
 Words of Peace Global

Practices 

 Teachings of Prem Rawat

Family 

 Hans Ram Singh Rawat, known as Hans Ji Maharaj, father
 Satpal Singh Rawat, known as Satpal Maharaj, brother
 Actress Navi Rawat, niece

Notable students, past and present 

 Jonathan Cainer, astrologer 
 Sophia Collier, author of the 1978 book Soul Rush: The Odyssey of a Young Woman of the '70s
 Rennie Davis,  prominent American anti-Vietnam War protest leader of the 1960s, one of the Chicago Seven defendants
 Timothy Gallwey, author of the series of books The Inner Game 
 Ron Geaves, scholar
 Jimmie Dale Gilmore, singer, songwriter
 John Grefe, chess master
 Jenny McLeod, composer

Books 

 Sacred Journeys
 Soul Rush
 Who Is Guru Maharaj Ji?

Scholarly analysts 

Students of Prem Rawat
 Lucy DuPertuis
 Ron Geaves, senior lecturer, Programme Leader and Chair in religious studies at the University of Chester in England
 Jeanne Messer

Others
 David V. Barrett,  American author who has written on religious and esoteric topics
 James V. Downton, professor at Sacramento State College and professor emeritus of Sociology at the  College of Arts and Sciences of the University of Colorado at Boulder
 George D. Chryssides, senior lecturer and Head of Religious Studies at the School of Humanities, Languages and Social Sciences of the University of Wolverhampton
 Daniel A. Foss
 Marc Galanter
 Jeffrey K. Hadden, professor of sociology at the University of Virginia
 Stephen J. Hunt,  British professor of sociology at the University of the West of England
 Andrew Kopkind, radical American journalist
 Stephen A. Kent,   professor in the Department of Sociology at the University of Alberta
 Reender Kranenborg, Dutch theologian specialized in sociology of religion and Hinduism
 Jan van der Lans,  Dutch professor in the psychology of religion at the  Catholic University of Nijmegen
 Ralph Larkin
 Saul V. Levine,  professor of psychiatry at the University of Toronto; author
 J. Gordon Melton, American religious scholar and research specialist in religion and new religious movements at the University of California, Santa Barbara
 Paul Schnabel,  Dutch sociologist and director of  Sociaal en Cultureel Planbureau of the Dutch government
 Margaret Singer, clinical psychologist and adjunct professor emeritus of psychology at the University of California, Berkeley, US
 Bryan R. Wilson, Reader Emeritus in Sociology at the University of Oxford and President of the International Society for the Sociology of Religion

Media 

 Lord of the Universe, documentary,  1974, won a DuPont-Columbia Award
 Words of Peace TV series

Interviewers 

 Marta Robles (2006)
 Rajiv Mehrotra, Doordarshan TV, (2006)
 Carmen Posadas, writer, (2004)
 Burt Wolf (2000)
 Tom Snyder,  The Tomorrow Show, (1973)
 John Wood, the Boston Globe (1973)

Biographers 

 Andrea Cagan, best-selling American writer and biographer

Multimedia

Photographs

Audio

Other articles of interest 
 Advait Mat
 Charismatic authority
 Guru
 Kriya
 Sant Mat
 Satguru
 Shabd
 Surat Shabda Yoga

References

External links 

Prem Rawat
Rawat, Prem
Rawat, Prem
Rawat, Prem